Institute of National Memory may refer to:

 National Memory Institute (Slovakia)
 Ukrainian Institute of National Memory
 Institute of National Remembrance: Commission for the Prosecution of Crimes against the Polish Nation